Mainstream were an English shoegazer band, briefly famous in the late 1990s.  They were formed by Mewton, Hartnell and Neill. Later they  were joined by Peter Mullaney (guitar) and later still (after a bit of searching) Mark James Aviss. After performing several successful gigs they attracted label interest. Immediately prior to signing with Nude Records, Peter Mullaney for various reasons departed, later to be replaced with Greg Cook. Signed to Suede's label Nude Records in early 1995 and produced one album (also called Mainstream) in 1998.
The band comprised Anthony Neale (voice) (now frontman for The Truths on Aardvark Records), James Hartnell (guitars), Conrad Mewton (bass), Greg Cook (keyboards) and Mark James Aviss (drums) (now with The Little Things).

Despite having been renowned for their live performances, the album failed to chart anywhere and the group split up shortly afterwards. 

However the album appears to be still in print and selling (as of October 2007 it was possible to find the album on the shelf in both the Virgin Megastore and the HMV on London's Oxford Street and it remains available from several on-line stores).  Also in 2006, a Myspace page was created for the band, although this only contains information about their prior career, and does not indicate either that the band have reformed or are planning to do so.

Discography

Albums
Mainstream (Nude), 1998

Singles
"Make It Easy" (Nude), promo 7"
"Hurricane" (Nude), 1997 
"Privilege" (Nude), 1997 (UK No. 85)
"Step Right Up" (Nude), 1998 (UK No. 80)
"CanJam" (Nude), 1998 (UK No. 88)

References

External links
 Myspace page 

English rock music groups
Musical groups established in 1994
British shoegaze musical groups
Musical groups disestablished in 1999
1998 albums
English alternative rock groups
1994 establishments in the United Kingdom